The Fender Showmaster is a discontinued model of electric guitar made by Fender, and is characteristic of a superstrat. Also see the badge change of Stagemaster due to legal reasons.

History
During the 1980s, superstrats were becoming popular amongst the many hard rock and metal guitarists, who needed the modifications to suit their individual playing styles. Soon, many guitar manufacturers began producing instruments with these modifications as standard. Most notable were the manufacturers Ibanez, Jackson/Charvel, Carvin and Yamaha. However, Fender itself had limited success thereabout. This was partially due to Fender's previous CBS ownership, which caused a drastic loss in Fender's quality and market share. The Showmaster was hence its most recent foray into the superstrat niche, and was introduced in 1998. Gene Baker, a master builder of Fender's Custom Shop at the time, was responsible for the creation of this set-neck, carved top version. Early Showmaster models (prototypes) were originally labeled as Stratocasters on their headstocks and are very rare. The Custom Shop Showmaster perimeter was a design supplied by John Suhr, another Senior master builder during that era. It started out as a US version of the Contemporary Stratocaster and featured two Fender Texas Special pickups in the neck and middle positions, a Seymour Duncan '59 Jeff Beck Trembucker in the lead position, a white pearloid pickguard and a deluxe locking tremolo bridge. Later after Suhr left it was turned into a back-routed carved set neck by Gene Baker. Suhr's new company Suhr Guitars actually cut the first 100 bodies for Fender.

Construction
Note: In descriptions of pickup configurations, H refers to humbuckers and S refers to single-coils.

The Fender Showmaster initially started as a Custom Shop model. It featured a carved maple top with hand scraped edges and cream binding, a set-neck maple neck (bolt-on on some models), a sleek mahogany body (many Showmaster guitars are made from basswood or alder; later models such as the Showmaster Elite, employ more exotic woods such as lacewood and spalted maple for the top and back), HSS or HH pickup configurations which consisted of Seymour Duncan '59 Trembucker humbucking pickups coupled with a pair of Fender Custom Shop Fat '50s single-coils. Other features included a rosewood or maple fingerboard with abalone inlays and 22 frets, as well as a choice of deluxe locking tremolo bridge, deluxe 2-point synchronized bridge with pop-in tremolo arm and stop-tail bridge (some Team Built one-off Showmasters came with the original Floyd Rose locking system and featured a lightweight ash body and a translucent Amber finish). Later, it appeared as a U.S. Special/Highway 1 model, retaining the set maple neck, Fender Enforcer humbuckers, a special "kill" switch and its traditional Stratocaster headstock (with Showmaster label, respectively), equipped with a Floyd Rose licensed vibrato and a 2-octave rosewood fingerboard. Some later Showmasters—such as the Elite—were produced in Korea, followed by Squier variants (formerly known as Stagemasters) featuring a basswood body, a reverse headstock, Floyd Rose licensed locking systems and Duncan Designed humbucking pickups.

All Showmaster carved top models featured back-routed controls like most superstrats and came with a choice of bridges, abalone-inlaid rosewood fretboards with 24 frets, Seymour Duncan pickups, locking machine heads, and an LSR roller nut. The Blackout version came with a graphite nut, no fretboard inlays and Fender humbuckers instead of Seymour Duncan on some variants. 

The main distinguishing feature of Fender Showmasters—with the exception of the Flat Head—from other superstrats is the luxurious carved (quilted and flamed) maple top with the hand-scraped edges and cream binding. The Showmaster series also included a short-lived 7-string version with a stop-tail bridge that had been introduced around 1999/2000 and discontinued two years later. The most distinct feature of the Showmaster Elites was the inclusion of a black-painted Telecaster-shaped headstock with pearloid tuner buttons.

In 2009, all Showmaster models were discontinued.

Squier models

Squier, Fender's budget marque, also produced the Showmaster. Most Squier Showmasters were made in China and retailed for $499. The line included a Jason Ellis signature model. There were Squier Showmasters marked "Crafted in Indonesia" as well (specs: HSS, 22 frets, rosewood fretboard, standard 2-point vibrato).

A few Korean made Squier neck-thru V4 Stagemasters were re-branded Squier Showmasters in 2002 when Fender dropped the Stagemaster name due to a trademark claim by Kramer.  It is not known exactly how many V4 neck-thrus were made with the Showmaster brand.

References

Showmaster
Musical instruments invented in the 1990s